Joviano de Lima Júnior (April 23, 1942 – June 21, 2012) was the Roman Catholic archbishop of the Roman Catholic Archdiocese of Ribeirão Preto, Brazil.

Ordained in 1969, de Lima Júnior was named bishop in 1995 and died while still in office.

Notes

1942 births
2012 deaths
21st-century Roman Catholic archbishops in Brazil
People from Uberaba
20th-century Roman Catholic archbishops in Brazil
Roman Catholic archbishops of Ribeirão Preto
Roman Catholic bishops of São Carlos